McCartys Village is a census-designated place (CDP) in Cibola County, New Mexico, consisting of the unincorporated community known as McCartys. The population was 48 at the time of the 2010 census. It is part of the Acoma Pueblo.

Geography
Indian Service Route 30 passes through the center of the community. Interstate 40 forms the northwestern edge of the CDP, with the nearest access from Exit 96,  to the northeast. Old U.S. Route 66 runs parallel to I-40 along the edge of McCartys.

Demographics

Education
All public schools in the county are operated by Grants/Cibola County Schools.

References

Census-designated places in Cibola County, New Mexico
Census-designated places in New Mexico